The Embassy of Japan, Bratislava is the diplomatic mission of Japan in Slovakia. It is located in the capital of Slovakia - Bratislava.

History 
The building of the Japanese Embassy is an unusually colored building located on the Main Square, Old Town in the center of Bratislava. 

In the past, the building was mainly used for administrative purposes, however today - the ground floor of the building is now used for stores with luxury items.

References 

B
Diplomatic missions in Bratislava
Japan–Slovakia relations